Women's events at the Artistic Gymnastics World Championships were first held in 1934 at the 10th World Championships. Only the All-Around and Team events were held. In 1950, at the 12th World Championships, the other apparatus events were added.

The women's individual all-around event was not held in 1992, 1996, and 2002.

Three medals are awarded: gold for first place, silver for second place, and bronze for third place. Tie breakers have not been used in every year. In the event of a tie between two gymnasts, both names are listed, and the following position (second for a tie for first, third for a tie for second) is left empty because a medal was not awarded for that position. If three gymnastics tied for a position, the following two positions are left empty.

Medalists

Bold numbers in brackets denotes record number of victories.

All-time medal count
Last updated after the 2022 World Championships.

Notes
 At the 2021 World Artistic Gymnastics Championships in Kitakyushu, Japan, in accordance with a ban by the World Anti-Doping Agency (WADA) and a decision by the Court of Arbitration for Sport (CAS), athletes from Russia were not permitted to use the Russian name, flag, or anthem. They instead participated under name and flag of the RGF (Russian Gymnastics Federation).

Multiple medalists

References

 FIG Results: 1903 World Artistic Gymnastics Championships
 FIG Results: 1905 World Artistic Gymnastics Championships
 FIG Results: 1907 World Artistic Gymnastics Championships
 FIG Results: 1909 World Artistic Gymnastics Championships
 FIG Results: 1911 World Artistic Gymnastics Championships
 FIG Results: 1913 World Artistic Gymnastics Championships
 FIG Results: 1922 World Artistic Gymnastics Championships
 FIG Results: 1926 World Artistic Gymnastics Championships
 FIG Results: 1930 World Artistic Gymnastics Championships
 FIG Results: 1934 World Artistic Gymnastics Championships
 FIG Results: 1938 World Artistic Gymnastics Championships
 FIG Results: 1950 World Artistic Gymnastics Championships
 FIG Results: 1954 World Artistic Gymnastics Championships
 FIG Results: 1958 World Artistic Gymnastics Championships
 FIG Results: 1962 World Artistic Gymnastics Championships
 FIG Results: 1966 World Artistic Gymnastics Championships
 FIG Results: 1970 World Artistic Gymnastics Championships
 FIG Results: 1974 World Artistic Gymnastics Championships
 FIG Results: 1978 World Artistic Gymnastics Championships
 FIG Results: 1979 World Artistic Gymnastics Championships
 FIG Results: 1981 World Artistic Gymnastics Championships
 FIG Results: 1983 World Artistic Gymnastics Championships
 FIG Results: 1985 World Artistic Gymnastics Championships
 FIG Results: 1987 World Artistic Gymnastics Championships
 FIG Results: 1989 World Artistic Gymnastics Championships
 FIG Results: 1991 World Artistic Gymnastics Championships
 FIG Results: 1992 World Artistic Gymnastics Championships
 FIG Results: 1993 World Artistic Gymnastics Championships
 FIG Results: 1994 World Artistic Gymnastics Championships (Individuals Competition)
 FIG Results: 1994 World Artistic Gymnastics Championships (Team Competition)
 FIG Results: 1995 World Artistic Gymnastics Championships
 FIG Results: 1996 World Artistic Gymnastics Championships
 FIG Results: 1997 World Artistic Gymnastics Championships
 FIG Results: 1999 World Artistic Gymnastics Championships
 FIG Results: 2001 World Artistic Gymnastics Championships
 FIG Results: 2002 World Artistic Gymnastics Championships
 FIG Results: 2003 World Artistic Gymnastics Championships
 FIG Results: 2005 World Artistic Gymnastics Championships
 FIG Results: 2006 Artistic Gymnastics World Championships
 FIG Results: 2007 Artistic Gymnastics World Championships
 Results: 2009 Artistic Gymnastics World Championships

World Artistic Gymnastics Championships
All-around artistic gymnastics